is a Japanese tokusatsu superhero television series produced by Tsuburaya Productions. It is the 30th entry to the Ultra Series overall, the sixth entry to the "New Generation Heroes" lineup and the last entry to the series released in the Heisei era. It aired on TV Tokyo on July 7, 2018.

Synopsis

The series takes place in Ayaka City, a jōkamachi-themed city that is funded by the mega corporation Aizentech. During the 15 year-anniversary of their mother's disappearance, Minato siblings Katsumi and Isami were rescued by the R/B Gyros from Grigio Bone's attack, transforming them into Ultramen Rosso and Blu. True to the show's theme of “bonds” and “love”, the brothers face their emotions with allies and against enemies, realizing important things they tend to take for granted. Although both siblings collide against each other, they willingly cooperate when fighting against opponents.

In the middle of the series, the perpetrator behind the monster attack was revealed to be Chereza, an alien who inhabited the body of Makoto Aizen to obtain the means to become an Ultraman, thus transforming into Ultraman Orb Dark. Unfortunately this doesn't last long as Saki Mitsurugi orchestrated his downfall and deposed Makoto to become the new president of Aizentech. With the Minato brothers obtaining the means to fuse into Ultraman Ruebe, Saki reveals herself as the youngest sister of a trio of siblings who died protecting the Earth, and her objective is to defeat Leugocyte in hopes of avenging her fallen brothers, former namesake users of Rosso and Blu.

In the middle of Saki's conflict with Minato brothers, Mio Minato returns from her disappearance and helped turn Leugocyte into a R/B Crystal and at the same time tried to stop the Minato brothers from becoming Ultramen in order to prevent their incoming deaths. Unfortunately Saki's determination to destroy the monster with the planet as a giant bomb foil Mio's plans and thus releasing Leugocyte in its corporeal state. With Earth nearing its explosion, Mio plans to banish Leugocyte and herself into an alternate dimension until the Minato siblings interfere, with Saki sacrificing her life to defend them. Having learned her extraterrestrial origin, Asahi becomes the Makoto Crystal and sacrificed herself to destroy Leugocyte by empowering Ultraman Ruebe. In aftermath of the battle, Asahi was revived as the Minato family went back to their normal lives.

Production
As mentioned by Tsuburaya Productions, this series is part of the  batch, which aired on TV Tokyo since the start of Ultraman Ginga. The new series is said to be filled with even more exciting elements than the past Ultra Series, with an unexpected story plot. Aside from the titular brothers fighting against their opponents, it also serves as a TV drama series focusing on the brothers’ family bond. In an interview conducted by Sports Hochi, filming of the series was revealed to have started on March 10, 2018. Takao Nakao returns from Ultraman Orb to serve as head of writing and series composition.

Episodes

Ultraman R/B The Movie
 was released on March 8, 2019.

Related media

Appearances in other Ultra Series media
 In the final episode of Ultraman Orb: The Chronicle, Katsumi and Isami made their appearance as they walk past Gai Kurenai during the evening.
Ultra Galaxy Fight: New Generation Heroes/Ultraman Taiga (2019)/Ultraman Taiga The Movie (2020): See here
Ultra Galaxy Fight: The Absolute Conspiracy (2020): Ultrawoman Grigio return to help Tri-Squad and Ultraman Z to stop the conspiracy led by Absolute Tartarus along with other Ultras without her brothers help.

Cast
, : 
, : 
: 
: 
: 
: 
: 
: 
R/B Gyro and Orb Ring NEO announcements (darker voice):

Guest cast

: 
:

Songs
Opening theme
"Hands"
Lyrics: 
Composition & Arrangement: Kentaro Sonoda, 
Artist: 
Episodes: 1-15 (Verse 1), 16, 18-24 (Verse 2)
A re-arranged version of this song is used in Episode 17.

Ending theme

Lyrics: 
Composition: 
Arrangement: EFFY
Artist: 
Episodes: 1-15 (Verse 1), 16-24 (Verse 2), 25

Notes

References

See also
Ultra Series - Complete list of official Ultraman-related shows.

External links
Ultraman R/B at Tsuburaya Productions 
Ultraman R/B at TV Tokyo 

2018 Japanese television series debuts
Ultra television series
TV Tokyo original programming
Television series about families
Television duos
Television series about siblings
2018 Japanese television series endings